Mahmoud Hassaballa (born 22 November 1986) is an Egyptian-Qatari handball player for Al Ahli and the Qatari national team.

He competed in the men's tournament at the 2008 Summer Olympics.

References

1986 births
Living people
Qatari male handball players
Asian Games medalists in handball
Handball players at the 2014 Asian Games
Naturalised citizens of Qatar
Qatari people of Egyptian descent
Asian Games gold medalists for Qatar
Medalists at the 2014 Asian Games
Egyptian male handball players
Olympic handball players of Egypt
Handball players at the 2008 Summer Olympics